Jahanshahi or Jahan Shahi may refer to:
 Jahan Shahi, Kerman